Garraveh-ye Esmail (also Romanized as Garrāveh-ye Esmāʿīl; also known as Garāveh, Garāwa, and Garrāveh-ye Yek) is a village in Nasrabad Rural District (Kermanshah Province), in the Central District of Qasr-e Shirin County, Kermanshah Province, Iran. At the 2006 census, its population was 158, in 41 families. The village is populated by Kurds.

References 

Populated places in Qasr-e Shirin County
Kurdish settlements in Kermanshah Province